o:XML is an open source, dynamically typed, general-purpose object-oriented programming language based on XML-syntax.  It has threads, exception handling, regular expressions and namespaces.  Additionally o:XML has an expression language very similar to XPath that allows functions to be invoked on nodes and node sets.

External links
 o:XML homepage
 Introduction to o:XML
 An alternative XML language: SuperX++

Object-oriented programming languages
XML-based programming languages